Chasing Your Tomorrows is the debut album by South African singer Candîce. It was released in 2003.

Track listing
 "Hello" 
 "It's The Music"
 "I Know What I Like"
 "While You're Here"
 "Disappointed"
 "Dumb"
 "The Sweetest Kiss"
 "Chasing Your Tomorrows"
 "You're Really Here"
 "You Don't Know What Love Is For"
 "Unexperienced"

Singles
"Hello" - November 2002 (South Africa), 21 June 2004 (UK)
Musketeer Records - Sony Music, Produced by Clive Young, Marty Frederickson and Jeremy Wheatley
UK Promo CD Track listing
"Hello" - (C. Young, R. Cain) - 3:48

2003 debut albums